L'Heure d'été is a 2005 album recorded by French artist Marc Lavoine. It was his ninth studio album and his 12th album overall. Released on May 23, 2005, it was successful in the francophone countries.

Content
L'Heure d'été provided two hit singles : "Je me sens si seul" (#16 in France) and "Toi mon amour" (#8 in France). "Tu m'as renversé" and "J'espère", a duet with Belgium singer of Vietnamese descent Quynh Anh, were just released as promotional singles.

In France, the album started at No. 3, its peak position, on May 28, 2005, before dropping slowly on the chart the weeks later. It managed to stay for nine weeks in the top ten, 63 weeks in the top 50 and 91 weeks on the chart (top 200). In Belgium (Wallonia), the album was ranked for 49 weeks. It entered the Ultratop 40 at No. 7 on June 4, 2005 and reached No. 2 two weeks later and for two consecutive weeks. It totaled 12 weeks in the top ten.

Releases

Track listing
 CD

+ 
 DVD
 "Je me sens si seul" (music video)
 "Toi mon amour" (music video)
 "Tu m'as renversé" (music video)

Source : Allmusic.

Personnel

Barilla.design – design
Denis Benarrosh – percussion
Jean-François Berger – electric guitar, Fender Rhodes, harmonica, keyboards, Korg MS-20, mandolin, piano, programming, string arrangement & conducting, trumpet & Wurlitzer
Jean-Pierre Bucolo – acoustic guitar & electric guitar
Clarisse Canteloube – front cover & inside photography
Christophe Deschamps – drums
Martin Jenkins – keyboards, programming
Claire Keim – backing vocals
Peter Lale – cello

Marc Lavoine – lead vocals & backing vocals
Sandrine Le Bars – executive producer
Jean-Marc Lubrano – inside photography
David Maurin – drums
François Poggio – acoustic guitar
Nick Rodwell – clarinet
Philippe Russo – electric guitar
Éric Sauviat – acoustic guitar & dobro
Matthew Vaughan – programming
Laurent Vernerey – bass guitar
Gavyn Wright – concertmaster

Artistic direction – Egidio Alves-Martins
Assistant & artistic coordination – Thomas Sandoval
Engineered by François Delabrière
Assistants – Denis Caribaux (Studio Guillaume Tell), Florian Lagatta (Studio Gang) & Valéry Pellegrini (Studio Méga D)
Mixed by François Delabrière at Studio Méga
Assistant – Éric Uzan
Mastered by George Marino at Sterling Sound, New York City

Charts

Certifications and sales

References

2005 albums
Marc Lavoine albums
Mercury Records albums